Padiyath Kochumoideen Kunjalu (1930  22 May 2000), known by his stage name Bahadoor, was an Indian actor and comedian who, along with Adoor Bhasi, redefined the way in which comedy and funny scenes were perceived in the Malayalam cinema. They made a significant contribution toward establishing comedy as the predominant genre of Malayalam cinema. Bahadoor also appeared in some serious roles and in professional plays. His last film was Joker, which released shortly after his death.

Early life
Bahadoor was born as P. K. Kunjalu in 1930 in Kodungalloor, near Thrissur in Kingdom of Cochin (present day Kerala, India). As one of the nine children of Padiyath Blangachalil Kochumoideen and Khadeeja. Out of his eight siblings, seven were sisters. His family was financially poor and the seven young women added to the burden as the Kerala social system openly supported dowry at that time. He had affinity towards plays from very young age itself. He passed 10th Standard with First Class and joined Farook College, Calicut for Intermediate. He could not complete his studies due to financial troubles and had to start working for a living. He found his first job in a private bus as the bus conductor. He still wished to be an actor. He met Thikkurussi Sukumaran Nair through a relative. Thikkurussi gave him the chance to act in films and renamed him Bahadoor.

Family
He was married to Jameela. The couple have three children, Siddhiq, Muhammed and Rukiya.

Career
Bahadoor made his debut with a minor role in Avakasi (1954). At that time he also acted in Akashavani and amateur-professional plays and got established as a good actor. Bahadoor got his first break with his role as Chakkaravakkan in Neela Production's Padatha Painkili. The film, which went on to become a big hit, marked Bahadoor's presence in the industry. He along with Adoor Bhasi formed a box office ruling combination and the duo is being compared to Laurel and Hardy. Bahadoor became the hero in Neelisali and Mucheettu Kalikkarante Makal. Bahadoor found time for acting in plays as well. He partnered a play production theatre which made blockbuster plays like Manikyakkottaram and Ballatha Pahayan. These plays were later made into feature films by him. In his entire career he appeared in a Tamil film Sathya starring Kamal Haasan, which was his only appearance in a non-Malayalam film to date, he played a supporting role as the father of Haasan's character.
Bahadoor started a black and white processing studio in Trivandrum named K. C. Lab. But the studio's establishment was ill-timed as films were shifting to colour. This caused financial troubles for Bahadoor and finally the studio was taken over by people to whom Bahadoor was indebted. Bahdoor also started a film distribution company only to face failures. He produced few films all of which failed at the box office. Even with his commercial debacles from the industry, he could meet his family's monetary requirements and mark his presence in the field of acting.
Bahadoor was last seen in Lohithadas's Joker. He did the role of a mentally ill veteran joker in a circus camp. In the film, he commits suicide by letting himself into the lion's cage in the circus den.

Awards
Kerala State Film Awards:

Second Best Actor – 1973 – Madhavikutty
Second Best Actor – 1976 – Aalinganam, Thulavarsham
Kerala state film awards for Best Comedy Artist – 1972 – Various films

Death
During his final days, Bahadoor suffered various health ailments, like diabetes, hypertension and high cholesterol. Failing health made him leave the film industry. But, he returned through the film Joker, only to leave the world soon later. On 22 May 2000 around 10 am, Bahadoor felt severe chest pain at his home in Chennai and was taken to Vijaya Hospital nearby. He died at the hospital by 3 pm due to internal bleeding in his brain caused by a heart attack.

Selected filmography

 Avakashi (1954)
 Baalyasakhi (1954) as Pachu Pilla
 Aniyathi (1955) as Bhasi
 Padatha Painkili (1957) as Chakkara Vakkan
 Jailppulli (1957) as Muthu
 Mariakutty (1958) as Kasim
 Nairu Pidicha Pulivaalu (1958) as Keshu
 Umma (1960) as Mammooj
 Kandam Bacha Kotte (1961) as Khader
 Jnaanasundari (1961) as John
 Unniyarcha (1961) as Kittu
 Puthiya Akasam Puthiya Bhoomi (1962) as Sankaran/Gopakumar
 Ammaye Kaanaan (1963) as Naanu
 Ninamaninja Kalpadukal (1963) as Mammooju
 School Master (1964) as Damodharan
 Aadyakiranangal (1964) as Velu
 Kutti Kuppayam (1964) as Avuran Mullakka
 Kalanju Kittiya Thankam (1964) as K. Ramachandran Maithanam
 Porter Kunjali (1965) as Pareed
 Daham (1965) as Aliyar
 Jeevithayaathra (1965) as Kochappan
 Kuppivala (1965) as Poker/Chellathodu
 Subaida (1965) as Mammu
 Tharavattamma (1966)
 Kasavuthattam (1967) as Pokker
 Chitra Mela (1967) as (segment "Penninte Prapancham")
 Balyakalasakhi (1967)
 Ashwamedam (1967) as Krishnandaji
 Agniputhri (1967) as Appunni Nair
 Viplavakarikal (1968) as Govindan
 Velutha Kathreena (1968) as Appayi
 Punnapra Vayalar (1968) as Paappi mooppan
 Kadal (1968) as Paul
 Yakshi (1968) as Paramu
 Ballatha Pahayan (1969) as Aliyar
 Kadalpalam (1969) as Appu
 Adimakal (1969) as Bhargavan
 Urangatha Sundary (1969) as Panicker
 Velliyazhcha (1969) as Madanan
 Vazhve Mayam (1970) as Kuttappan
 Aranazhikaneram (1970) as Kunjucherukkan
 Nizhalattam (1970) as Kurup
 Cross Belt (1970) as Thilakan
 Bheekara Nimishangal (1970) as Sankaran 
 Mindapennu (1970) as Unnikrishanan
 Oonjal (1970) as Appu Nair
 Thurakkatha Vathil (1970) as Narayanankutty
 C.I.D. Nazir (1971) as Pappu
 Rathri Vandi (1971)
 Sindooracheppu (1971) as Mammad
 Achante Bharya (1971) as Balan Nair
 Line Bus (1971) as Vareed
 Anadha Shilpangal (1971) as Balakrishnan
 Sumangali (1971) as Keeri Keshava Kuruppu
 Vilakku Vangiya Veena (1971) as Prathapan
 Ernakulam Junction (1971) as Kunjali
 Thettu (1971) as Kochappi
 Anubhavangal Paalichakal (1971) as Hamsa
 Miss Mary (1972) as Raju
 Kandavarundo (1972) as Venu
 Omana (1972) as Lonappan
 Professor (1972) as Magician
 Chembarathi (1972) as Vasu
 Taxi Car (1972) as Nadathara Rajappan
 Achanum Bappayum (1972) as Abdulla
 Aradimanninte Janmi (1972) as Ouseppu
 Adyathe Kadha (1972) as Kuttan Pilla
 Panimudakku (1972) as Salim/Ummer
 Maravil Thirivu Sookshikkuka (1972) as Puncture Antony
 Panitheeratha Veedu (1973)
 Interview (1973) as Kuttappan
 Nakhangal (1973) as Pappu
 Kapalika (1973) as Gopalan
 Azhakulla Saleena (1973) as Daiman Mathai
 Chuzhi (1973) as Abbas
 Dharmayudham (1973) as Vikraman
 Maram (1973) as Mollakka
 Manushyaputhran (1973) as Kochu Govindan
 Achani (1973) as Appu
 Panitheeratha Veedu (1973) as Moideen Kakka, Hameed (double role)
 Kaadu (1973) as Sekhar
 Padmavyooham (1973) as Paulose
 Kalachakram (1973) as Prabha
 Divya Darshanam (1973) as Velappan Panikkar
 Yamini (1973) as Doc Chandran
 Ladies Hostel (1973) as Kuttan Pilla
 Udayam (1973) as Ittiyavara
 Swargaputhri (1973) as Kunjali
 Panchavadi (1973) as Keshava Pilla
 Rajahamsam (1974) as Keshavan Nair
 Chattakkari (1974) as Rahim
 College Girl (1974) as Damu
 Panchathanthram (1974) as Guptha 
 Poonthenaruvi (1974) as Poovan
 Thacholi Marumakan Chandu (1974) as Pokkan
 Manyasree Viswamithran (1974) as Balachandran
 Night Duty  (1974) as Readymade Krishnankutty
 Pattabhishekam (1974) as Bahadoor
 Bhoomidevi Pushpiniyayi (1974) as Appunni
 Ayalathe Sundari (1974) as Pappu Pilla
 Nellu (1974) as Seythali
 Neela Ponman (1975) as Paappi
 Thomashleeha (1975) 
 Alibabayum 41 Kallanmarum (1975) as Shukkur
 Ayodhya (1975) as Jayaraman
 Babumon (1975) as Panikkar
 Penpada (1975) as Vasu
 Love Marriage (1975) as Gopi
 Hello Darling (1975) as Appukuttan
 Picnic (1975) as Venu
 Pravaham (1975) as Kunnel Raghavan
 Themmadi Velappan (1976) as Kuttappan
 Thulavarsham (1976) as Ayappan
 Ayiram Janmagal (1976) as A. Krishnan
 Aalinganam (1976) as Rajashekharan
 Chirikudukka (1976) as Babu, Paraman
 Ayalkkari (1976) as Varghese 
 Panchami (1976) as Philippose
 Prasadam (1976)
 Light House (1976) as Damu
 Randu Lokam (1977) as Govindan
 Angeekaram (1977) as Gangadharan
 Abhinivesham (1977) as Rajan
 Samudram (1977) as Shekhardas
 Aparadhi (1977) as Ouseppachan
 Anugraham as Madhavan Pilla
 Shankupushppam (1977) as Mammad
 Poojakkedukkatha Pookkal (1977) as Kuttan Pilla
 Rathi Nirvedham (1978) as Kochammani
 Itha Oru Manushyan (1978) as Nanu
 Agni (1978) 
 Kanyaka (1978) as Aliyar
 Ee Manohara Theeram (1978) as Mathai
 Arum Anyaralla (1978) as Pralokam Pappu
 Neelathamara (1979) as Achuthan Nair
 Ezhunirangal (1979) as Pappachan 
 Ivide Kattinu Sugandam (1979) as Raman Pilla
 Itha Oru Theeram (1979) as Sankara Pilla
 Allauddinum Albhutha Vilakkum (1979) as Hakkim Moulavi Sahib
 Theekkadal (1980) as Shekharan Pillai
 Sakthi (1980) as Paramu Pillai
 Lava (1980) as Govindan
 Aravam (1980) as Murukayya
 Prakadanam (1980) as Master
 Vilkkanundu Swapnangal (1980) as Mammukka
 Palangal (1981) as Varkey
 Sanchari (1981) as Sankaran
 Grihalakshmi (1981) as Raman Pilla
 Greeshmajwaala (1981) as Unnithan
 Guha (1981) as Chandrasekhara Kaimal
 Kathayariyathe (1981) as Raman Nair
 Sara Varsham (1982) as Ravunni Nair
 Ponnum Poovum (1982) as Khadir
 Beedikunjamma (1982) as Velu Nair
 Anuraagakkodathi (1982) as Gopalan
 Nizhal Moodiya Nirangal (1983) as Kakka
 Eettillam (1983) as Njodi Vasu
 Visa (1983) as Kuttyalikka
 Mandanmmar Londanil (1983) as Choyi Mooppan
 Swapname Ninakku Nandi (1983) as Bakker
 Maniyara (1983) as Hassanali
 Naseema (1983) as School Master
 Kurukkante Kalyanam (1982) as Soopi Hajiyar
 Veena Poovu (1983) as Kudayaani
 Mazha Nilaavu (1983) as Abdulla
 Piriyilla Naam (1984) as Vareechan
 Ivide Thudangunnu (1984) as Kurup
 Appunni (1984) as Hajiyar
 Vellam (1984) as Kuttan Nair
 Manithali (1984) as Kunjanikka 
 Kaliyil Alpam Karyam (1984) as Rarichan Nair
 Oru Sumangaliyude Katha (1984) as Kumaradas
 Thacholi Thankappan (1984) as Abu
 Kudumbam Oru Swargam Bharya Oru Devatha (1984) as Krishna Pilla
 Adiyozhukkukal (1984) as Muni Kakka
 Koodum Thedi (1985) as Judy's Father
 Janakeeya Kodathi (1985) as Suma's Father
 Azhiyatha Bandhangal (1985) as Easwara Pillai
 Adhyayam Onnu Muthal (1985) as Maash
 Makan Ente Makan (1985) as Sankan Nair
 Anu Bandham (1985) as Madhavan
 Ente Kanakkuyil (1985) as Sankara Pillai
 Oru Sandesham Koodi (1985) as Rajasekharan Nair
 Kathodu Kathoram (1985) as Paily
 Kiratham (1985) as Musliyar
 Pappan Priyappetta Pappan (1986) as Padmanaban/Pappan
 Revathikkoru Pavakkutty (1986) as Ayyappan Pillai
 Oppam Oppathinoppam (1986)
 Oru Yugasandhya (1986) as Pappu Pilla
 Kochu Themmadi (1986) as Kelappan Nair
 Katturumbinum Kathu Kuthu (1986) as Minister
 Adukkan Entheluppam (1986) as Peter
 Kaalathinte Sabhdam (1987) as Nanu Pilla
 Naradhan Keralathil (1987) as Kuttan Pillai
 Anantaram (1987) as Mathai
 Neeyallengil Njan (1987) as Pilla
 Ithrayum Kalam (1987) as Khader 
 Aranyakam (1988) as Nanu
 Sathya (1988) as Rajarathinam Mudaliyar
 Oru CBI Diary Kurippu (1988) as Thomachan
 Bhadrachitta (1989)
 Devadas (1989) as Raman Nair
 Kali Karyamaai: Crime Branch (1989) as Mukundan Nair
 Oru Sayahnathinte Swapnam (1989) as Kunju Krishna Kaimal
 Orukkam (1990) as Kumaran
 Thoovalsparsham (1990) as Nair
 Oliyampukal (1990) as T. P. Chackochan
 Kilukkampetti (1991) as Muthachan
 Soorya Gayathri (1992) as Kunjali
 Malootty (1992) as Kuttan Pillai
 Ghoshayathra (1993) as Saidukka
 Varanamaalyam (1994) as Kunjunni
 Parinayam (1994) as Kizhakkedam
 Sphadikam (1995) as Kurup
 Vanarasena (1996) as Lambodaran
 Man of the Match (1996)
 Joker (2000) as Abookka

References

External links
 A short biography (in Malayalam)
 An article published in Janayugam (in Malayalam)
 
 Bahadoor at MSI

1930 births
2000 deaths
Indian male film actors
People from Thrissur district
Male actors from Kerala
Kerala State Film Award winners
Male actors in Malayalam cinema
20th-century Indian male actors
Malayalam comedians
Indian male comedians
20th-century comedians
Male actors from Thrissur